Thomas William Walker (August 1, 1881 – July 10, 1944), was a Major League Baseball pitcher in 1902 with the Philadelphia Athletics and in 1904 and 1905 with the Cincinnati Reds. He batted and threw right-handed.

He was born in Philadelphia, and died in Woodbury Heights, New Jersey.

External links

1881 births
1944 deaths
Major League Baseball pitchers
Baseball players from Pennsylvania
Philadelphia Athletics players
Cincinnati Reds players
Milton Poets players
Pottsville Greys players
Fall River Indians players
Rochester Bronchos players
Schenectady Electricians players
Binghamton Bingoes players
Louisville Colonels (minor league) players
Williamsport Millionaires players
Wilmington Peaches players